Eupsittula is a genus of South and Middle American parakeets in the tribe Arini. Until 2013, all the species were believed to belong to the genus Aratinga. Some of the Eupsittula species are kept in aviculture or as companion parrots, where they are commonly known as conures.

Taxonomy
The genus Eupsittula was introduced in 1853 by the French naturalist Charles Lucien Bonaparte with the orange-fronted parakeet as the type species. The genus name combines the Ancient Greek eu meaning "good" with the Modern Latin psittula meaning "little parrot".

The genus contains five species.

References

 
Parakeets
Bird genera